The 1993 DFS Classic was a women's tennis tournament played on outdoor grass courts that was part of Tier III of the 1993 WTA Tour. It was the 12th edition of the event and the first to be named the "DFS Classic" after the change in sponsor from the previous years. It took place at the Edgbaston Priory Club in Birmingham, United Kingdom from 7 June until 13 June 1993.

Entrants

Seeds

Other entrants
The following players received wildcards into the main draw:
  Jo Durie
  Amanda Grunfeld
  Shirli-Ann Siddall
  Lorna Woodroffe

The following players received entry from the qualifying draw:
  Katrina Adams
  Sophie Amiach
  Ann Henricksson
  Cammy MacGregor
  Shannan McCarthy
  Tammy Whittington

The following player received a lucky loser spot:
  Maria Strandlund

Finals

Singles

 Lori McNeil defeated  Zina Garrison-Jackson 6–4, 2–6, 6–3
 It was McNeil's first title of the year and the 9th of her career.

Doubles

 Lori McNeil /  Martina Navratilova defeated  Pam Shriver /  Elizabeth Smylie 6–3, 6–4
 It was McNeil's first doubles title of the year and the 26th of her career. It was Navratilova's second doubles title of the year and the 162nd of her career.

External links
 1993 DFS Classic draws
 ITF tournament edition details

DFS Classic
Birmingham Classic (tennis)
DFS Classic
DFS Classic